Chalderaz-e Yadollah (also Romanized as Chālderāz-e Yadollah) is a village in Barez Rural District, Manj District, Lordegan County, Chaharmahal and Bakhtiari Province, Iran. At the 2006 census, its population was 54, in 9 families.

References 

Populated places in Lordegan County